The EFL Awards is an annual awards ceremony commemorating association football players, clubs and associated individuals involved in the three divisions of the English Football League (EFL). 

The event was established in 2006 and is usually held at the Grosvenor House Hotel, London in March or April of each year, towards the end of the football league season.

2006 Awards
Date: 5 March 2006
Venue: Grosvenor House Hotel, London

2007 Awards
Date: 4 March 2007
Venue: Grosvenor House Hotel, London

2008 Awards
Date: 2 March 2008
Venue: Grosvenor House Hotel, London

2009 Awards
Date: 29 March 2009
Venue: Grosvenor House Hotel, London

2010 Awards
Date: 14 March 2010
Venue: Grosvenor House Hotel, London

2011 Awards
Date: 20 March 2011
Venue: The Brewery, London

2012 Awards
Date: 11 March 2012
Venue: The Brewery, London

2013 Awards

Date: 24 March 2013
Venue: The Brewery, London

2014 Awards

Date: 16 March 2014
Venue: The Brewery, London

2015 Awards
Date: 19 April 2015
Venue: The Brewery, London

To celebrate the 10th anniversary of the awards, a Team of the Decade was named highlighting the best eleven players and manager of the previous ten years.

Manager:  Eddie Howe

2016 Awards
Date: 17 April 2016
Venue: Manchester Central Convention Complex, Manchester

Manager:  Chris Wilder (Northampton Town)

2017 Awards
Date: 9 April 2017
Venue: London Hilton on Park Lane, London

Manager:  Darren Ferguson (Doncaster Rovers)

2018 Awards
Date: 15 April 2018
Venue: London Hilton on Park Lane, London

Manager:  John Coleman (Accrington Stanley)

2019 Awards
Date: 7 April 2019
Venue: Grosvenor House Hotel, London

Manager:  Chris Wilder (Sheffield United)

2020 Awards
The 2020 awards ceremony was cancelled due to the COVID-19 pandemic. The winners were announced on 27 August 2020. Due to the shortened season, no Team of the Season was named.

2021 Awards
Date: 29 April 2021
Venue: Sky Sports

Football Manager EFL Teams of the Season
The following players were voted for by the EFL as the best players and managers in their respective leagues. This was the first year in which a Team of the Season was named for each individual league.

2022 Awards
Date: 24 April 2022
Venue: Grosvenor House Hotel, London

Football Manager EFL Teams of the Season
The following players were voted for by the EFL as the best players and managers in their respective leagues.

References

English Football League trophies and awards
Recurring events established in 2006